DeLaurenti Food & Wine is an Italian speciality grocery store and delicatessen at Seattle's Pike Place Market, in the U.S. state of Washington.

Description 
DeLaurenti Food & Wine is an Italian grocery store and delicatessen at Pike Place Market. The business stocks various products such as antipasto, breads, cheeses, canned fish, olives and olive oil, dried pastas, prosciutto, salami, and tomato sauce. The deli serves pizza, Italian sandwiches, and meatballs in marinara sauce. The Parma sandwich has prosciutto, arugula, white truffle oil, and shaved Parmesan on an Italian sandwich roll.

History 
DeLaurenti was established in 1946.

Reception 

Lonely Planet has described the business as "a great place for any aficionado of Italian foods to browse and sample". Dylan Joffe included DeLaurenti in Thrillist's 2016 list of "The Secret Hidden Gems of Pike Place Market". The business was included in Seattle Weekly 2016 list of "Top 12 Spots for Cheese Addicts in Seattle". In 2021, Aimee Rizzo of Seattle Magazine called DeLaurenti one of the city's "best-kept secrets" with "an extremely diverse" wine selection.

Lesley Balla included the grocery store in Eater Seattle 2019 overview of "The Greatest Places to Eat in Seattle's Greatest Tourist Trap". The website's Jade Yamazaki Stewart included DeLaurenti in a 2022 list of "20 Great Restaurants Near Pike Place Market". Zoe Sayler included the shop in Seattle Metropolitan 2022 list of "Where to Find Last-Minute Gifts in Your Neighborhood".

See also 

 List of delicatessens
 List of Italian restaurants

References

External links 

 
 DeLaurenti Food & Wine at Pike Place Market
 DELAURENTI FOOD & WINE: A PIKE PLACE MARKET LANDMARK at L'ITALO AMERICANO

1946 establishments in Washington (state)
American companies established in 1946
Central Waterfront, Seattle
Companies based in Seattle
Delicatessens in Washington (state)
Food retailers of the United States
Italian restaurants in Seattle
Pike Place Market
Restaurants established in 1946